In hyperbolic geometry, a hyperbolic triangle is a triangle in the hyperbolic plane. It consists of three line segments called sides or edges and three points called angles or vertices.

Just as in the Euclidean case, three points of a hyperbolic space of an arbitrary dimension always lie on the same plane. Hence planar hyperbolic triangles also describe triangles possible in any higher dimension of hyperbolic spaces.

Definition
A hyperbolic triangle consists of three non-collinear points and the three segments between them.

Properties
Hyperbolic triangles have some properties that are analogous to those of triangles in Euclidean geometry:

Each hyperbolic triangle has an inscribed circle but not every hyperbolic triangle has a circumscribed circle (see below). Its vertices can lie on a horocycle or hypercycle.

Hyperbolic triangles have some properties that are analogous to those of triangles in spherical or elliptic geometry:

Two triangles with the same angle sum are equal in area.
There is an upper bound for the area of triangles.
There is an upper bound for radius of the inscribed circle.
Two triangles are congruent if and only if they correspond under a finite product of line reflections.
Two triangles with corresponding angles equal are congruent (i.e., all similar triangles are congruent).

Hyperbolic triangles have some properties that are the opposite of the properties of triangles in spherical or elliptic geometry:

The angle sum of a triangle is less than 180°.
The area of a triangle is proportional to the deficit of its angle sum from 180°.

Hyperbolic triangles also have some properties that are not found in other geometries:

Some hyperbolic triangles have no circumscribed circle, this is the case when at least one of its vertices is an ideal point or when all of its vertices lie on a horocycle or on a one sided hypercycle.
Hyperbolic triangles are thin, there is a maximum distance δ from a point on an edge to one of the other two edges. This principle gave rise to δ-hyperbolic space.

Triangles with ideal vertices

The definition of a triangle can be generalized, permitting vertices on the ideal boundary of the plane while keeping the sides within the plane. If a pair of sides is limiting parallel (i.e. the distance between them approaches zero as they tend to the ideal point, but they do not intersect), then they end at an ideal vertex represented as an omega point.

Such a pair of sides may also be said to form an angle of zero.

A triangle with a zero angle is impossible in Euclidean geometry for straight sides lying on distinct lines. However, such zero angles are possible with tangent circles.

A triangle with one ideal vertex is called an omega triangle.

Special Triangles with ideal vertices are:

Triangle of parallelism
A triangle where one vertex is an ideal point, one angle is right: the third angle is the angle of parallelism for the length of the side between the right and the third angle.

Schweikart triangle
The triangle where two vertices are ideal points and the remaining angle is right, one of the first hyperbolic triangles (1818) described by Ferdinand Karl Schweikart.

Ideal triangle

The triangle where all vertices are ideal points, an ideal triangle is the largest possible triangle in hyperbolic geometry because of the zero sum of the angles.

Standardized Gaussian curvature
The relations among the angles and sides are analogous to those of spherical trigonometry; the length scale for both spherical geometry and hyperbolic geometry can for example be defined as the length of a side of an equilateral triangle with fixed angles.

The length scale is most convenient if the lengths are measured in terms of the absolute length (a special unit of length analogous to a relations between distances in spherical geometry). This choice for this length scale makes formulas simpler.

In terms of the (constant and negative) Gaussian curvature  of a hyperbolic plane, a unit of absolute length corresponds to a length of
.

In a hyperbolic triangle the sum of the angles A, B, C (respectively opposite to the side with the corresponding letter) is strictly less than a straight angle. The difference between the measure of a straight angle and the sum of the measures of a triangle's angles is called the defect of the triangle. The area of a hyperbolic triangle is equal to its defect multiplied by the square of :
.

This theorem, first proven by Johann Heinrich Lambert, is related to Girard's theorem in spherical geometry.

Trigonometry
In other words, the quantity  in the paragraph above is supposed to be equal to 1.

Trigonometric formulas for hyperbolic triangles depend on the hyperbolic functions sinh, cosh, and tanh.

Trigonometry of right triangles
If C is a right angle then:
The sine of angle A is the hyperbolic sine of the side opposite the angle divided by the hyperbolic sine of the hypotenuse.

The cosine of angle A is the hyperbolic tangent of the adjacent leg divided by the hyperbolic tangent of the hypotenuse.

The tangent of angle A is the hyperbolic tangent of the opposite leg divided by the hyperbolic sine of the adjacent leg.
.

The hyperbolic cosine of the adjacent leg to angle A is the cosine of angle B divided by the sine of angle A.
.

The hyperbolic cosine of the hypotenuse is the product of the hyperbolic cosines  of the legs.
.

The hyperbolic cosine of the hypotenuse is also the product of the cosines of the angles divided by the product of their sines.

Relations between angles
We also have the following equations:

Area
The area of a right angled triangle is:

The area for any other triangle is:

also

Angle of parallelism
The instance of an omega triangle with a right angle provides the configuration to examine the angle of parallelism in the triangle.

Equilateral triangle
The trigonometry formulas of right triangles also give the relations between the sides s and the angles A of an equilateral triangle (a triangle where all sides have the same length and all angles are equal).

The relations are:

General trigonometry
Whether C is a right angle or not, the following relationships hold:
The hyperbolic law of cosines is as follows:

Its dual theorem is

There is also a law of sines:

and a four-parts formula:

which is derived in the same way as the analogue formula in spherical trigonometry.

See also
Pair of pants (mathematics)
Triangle group
For hyperbolic trigonometry:
Angle of parallelism
Hyperbolic law of cosines
Hyperbolic law of sines
Lambert quadrilateral
Saccheri quadrilateral

References

Further reading
Svetlana Katok (1992) Fuchsian Groups, University of Chicago Press 

Triangle
Types of triangles